Chacella is a genus of shrimps belonging to the family Palaemonidae.

The species of this genus are found in Western Northern America.

Species:
 Chacella kerstitchi (Wicksten, 1983)

References

Palaemonidae